Inehart Mozelle Britton (May 2, 1912 – May 18, 1953) was an American actress, casting director, newspaper columnist, and songwriter. She was sometimes billed as Mozelle Brittonne.

Personal life
Britton was the daughter of Mr. and Mrs. A. V. Britton, and she graduated from Classen High School. She was wed on June 28, 1933.

Career
On Broadway, billed as Mozelle Brittone, she portrayed May in Alley Cat (1934) and Linda Roberts in Separate Rooms (1940).

Death
Britton died, aged 41, at the Good Samaritan Hospital in Los Angeles, where she had been under treatment for a heart ailment. According to her sister, Mrs. Allamae Gingg, Britton's death was hastened by overwork. She had been preparing a benefit show in San Diego for the American Cancer Society. She and her first husband are entombed together at Forest Lawn Memorial Park in Glendale, California.

Selected filmography
1930 Paramount on Parade
1934 The Fighting Ranger
1936 Night Waitress
1936 Rainbow on the River

References

Sources
Los Angeles Times, May 19, 1953, "Mozelle Dinehart, 41, Widow of actor, Dies".
Los Angeles Times, June 17, 1953, "Alan Dinehart's Widow Wills Mother estate"

External links

1912 births
1953 deaths
20th-century American actresses
Actresses from Los Angeles
American columnists
American film actresses
American women songwriters
Classen School of Advanced Studies alumni
Songwriters from Oklahoma
Writers from Los Angeles
Burials at Forest Lawn Memorial Park (Glendale)